Anthony Cesario (July 19, 1976 – September 25, 2010) was an American football offensive lineman. He attended Colorado State University, where he was a three-time All-Conference player.

After an NFL career cut short by injuries, Cesario ran a business in Fort Collins, Colorado. He was inducted into the Colorado State University Athletics Hall of Fame in 2007.

Cesario died of an apparent heart attack near Steamboat Springs, Colorado at 34 years old.

References

1976 births
2010 deaths
Players of American football from Colorado
American football offensive linemen
Colorado State Rams football players
Sportspeople from Pueblo, Colorado